Petralona can refer to :
 Petralona, a neighborhood of Athens ;
 Petralona (Chalcidice), a village in Chalcidice, famous for the Petralona cave in which was discovered in 1960 the earliest European humanoid.